Corn Island is a forested island of Essex County, Massachusetts.

References

Islands of Essex County, Massachusetts
Uninhabited islands of Massachusetts